The Europe Zone was one of the three regional zones of the 1957 Davis Cup.

24 teams entered the Europe Zone, with the winner going on to compete in the Inter-Zonal Zone against the winners of the America Zone and Eastern Zone. Belgium defeated Italy in the final and progressed to the Inter-Zonal Zone.

Draw

First round

Romania vs. Austria

Spain vs. South Africa

Luxembourg vs. Poland

Netherlands vs. Norway

Yugoslavia vs. Mexico

Lebanon vs. New Zealand

Switzerland vs. Czechoslovakia

Second round

Austria vs. Sweden

Denmark vs. South Africa

Poland vs. Chile

Netherlands vs. Italy

Belgium vs. Hungary

West Germany vs. Mexico

Great Britain vs. New Zealand

France vs. Czechoslovakia

Quarterfinals

Sweden vs. Denmark

Italy vs. Poland

Belgium vs. Mexico

France vs. Great Britain

Semifinals

Italy vs. Sweden

Belgium vs. Great Britain

Final

Belgium vs. Italy

References

External links
Davis Cup official website

Davis Cup Europe/Africa Zone
Europe Zone
Davis Cup